Cthulhu Companion is a supplement published by Chaosium in 1983 for Call of Cthulhu .

Contents
Cthulhu Companion is a supplement with information on prisons, insanity, Mythos creatures, notes on the Necronomicon, and poetry by H.P. Lovecraft, and contains three short scenarios.

Publication history
Cthulhu Companion is a collection of essays written by Sandy Petersen, Glenn Rahman, Lynn Willis, Morgan Conrad, Alan K. Crandall, Gene Day, William Hamblin, Keith Herber, Chris Marrinan, John Sullivan, Tom Sullivan, and Richard L. Tierney, and edited by Sandy Petersen and Yurek Chodak. It was published by Chaosium in 1983 as a 64-page book, with cover art by Chris Marrinan, and interior art by Gene Day, Tom Sullivan, and Lisa A. Free.

Reception
Jon Sutherland reviewed Cthulhu Companion for White Dwarf #51, giving it an overall rating of 7 out of 10, and stated that "In conclusion, this tome is really of use only to the Keepers of Arcane Knowledge and given that this does not set out to fundamentally change any of the basic rules themselves, again this will limit appeal. The scenarios are quite good and altogether, this represents a predictable package and is reasonable value for money."

Graeme Davis reviewed Cthulhu Companion for Imagine magazine, and stated that "there is nothing which is not immediately useful to any campaign, and it is to be hoped that future supplements will maintain the very impressive standard of the Cthulhu Companion. The value for money is excellent, and no Call of Cthulhu referee can afford to be without it."

In the September–October 1984 edition of Different Worlds (Issue #36), Steve Marsh was slightly disappointed about this product, commenting that some of the material was very good, but some essays were of more questionable utility.  He concluded, "Its only failure is that it is merely a good solid work instead of the brilliance I was expecting."

References

Call of Cthulhu (role-playing game) supplements
Role-playing game supplements introduced in 1983